Wrightsville is a city in Johnson County, Georgia, United States. The population was 2,195 at the 2010 census, down from 2,223 at the 2000 census. The city limits include Johnson State Prison on the northeast side of town. The city is the county seat of Johnson County. Wrightsville is part of the Dublin Micropolitan Statistical Area.

History
The Georgia General Assembly incorporated Wrightsville in 1866. The community was named after John B. Wright, a town promoter.

Geography
Wrightsville is located west of the center of Johnson County at  (32.725126, -82.720289). U.S. Route 319 passes through the city center on Elm Street; it leads northeast  to Bartow and southwest  to Dublin. State Routes 15 and 57 also pass through the center of Wrightsville. SR-15 leads north  to Sandersville and southeast  to Adrian, while SR-57 leads west  to Irwinton and southeast  to Swainsboro.

The city is drained by tributaries of the Ohoopee River.

Demographics

2020 census

As of the 2020 United States census, there were 3,449 people, 1,148 households, and 631 families residing in the city.

2000 census
As of the census of 2000, there were 2,223 people, 867 households, and 564 families residing in the city. The racial makeup of the city was 53.49% African American, 45.88% White, 0.22% Asian, 0.04% from other races, and 0.36% from two or more races. Hispanic or Latino of any race were 0.67% of the population.

There were 867 households, out of which 30.0% had children under the age of 18 living with them, 35.4% were married couples living together, 26.4% had a female householder with no husband present, and 34.9% were non-families. 33.0% of all households were made up of individuals, and 16.5% had someone living alone who was 65 years of age or older.  The average household size was 2.44 and the average family size was 3.10.

In the city, the population was spread out, with 27.2% under the age of 18, 9.9% from 18 to 24, 23.7% from 25 to 44, 20.5% from 45 to 64, and 18.8% who were 65 years of age or older.  The median age was 37 years. For every 100 females, there were 80.7 males.  For every 100 females age 18 and over, there were 72.1 males.

The median income for a household in the city was $17,750, and the median income for a family was $21,429. Males had a median income of $24,808 versus $19,167 for females. The per capita income for the city was $10,070.  About 33.7% of families and 35.5% of the population were below the poverty line, including 52.6% of those under age 18 and 26.4% of those age 65 or over.

Education

Johnson County School District 
The Johnson County School District holds pre-school to grade twelve, and consists of one elementary school, one middle school, and one high school. The district has 86 full-time teachers and over 1,384 students.
Johnson County Elementary School
Johnson County Middle School
Johnson County High School

Arts and culture
The Old Fashioned Fourth of July Festival has been held in the small town of Wrightsville since 1976.  It starts on the eve of July 4 with a fireworks show.  This is followed by a street dance on the courthouse square.  The festivities continue the next morning with a parade of various floats created by churches and businesses in the community.  There is a contest for the winning float design.  Following the parade, there are various booths and vendors set up downtown.

Notable people
 J. Roy Rowland, Congressman from 1983 to 1995
 Herschel Walker

References

Cities in Georgia (U.S. state)
Cities in Johnson County, Georgia
County seats in Georgia (U.S. state)
Dublin, Georgia micropolitan area